John Frederick Ovenden (17 August 1942 – 17 July 2018) was a British Labour Party politician.

Born in Kent, Ovenden was educated at the Chatham House Grammar School in Ramsgate.  From 1961 until 1974, he worked as an engineer with the Post Office.  He joined the Labour Party, and served on Gillingham Council from 1966 to 1969, and again from 1972 to 1974.

Having fought Sevenoaks in 1970, Ovenden served as Member of Parliament for the marginal seat of Gravesend from 1974 to 1979, when he lost to the Conservative Timothy Brinton. He was Leader of the Labour Group and co-Leader of Kent County Council (in a Labour /Lib Dem Alliance) from 1993 to 1997- the only period of non-Conservative control in the Council's history.

References

Times Guide to the House of Commons 1979

External links 
 

1942 births
2018 deaths
People educated at Chatham House Grammar School
Labour Party (UK) MPs for English constituencies
UK MPs 1974
UK MPs 1974–1979
Members of Kent County Council